Forefather is an English folk metal band from Surrey. They also incorporate elements of Viking metal and black metal. Since inception in 1997 the band has released seven studio albums.

History
Forefather was formed in September 1997 by brothers Wulfstan and Athelstan. Two years later Forefather released its first album, Deep Into Time, on the band's own label, Angelisc Enterprises, on which two more albums would be released by the band, The Fighting Man and Engla Tocyme, in 2000 and 2002, respectively. Forefather's fourth album, Ours Is the Kingdom was released in 2004 by Karmageddon Media, on which the band's entire back catalogue of albums was re-released as well - remastered and with added bonus tracks. In 2008, Forefather released its fifth album, Steadfast, on the band's new own label, Seven Kingdoms, on which three years later the band's sixth album, Last of the Line, would also be released.  In April 2015, the band released a new album, Curse of the Cwelled, on St George's Day, again on their own Seven Kingdoms label. In 2017, they released their latest album, Tales from a Cloud-Born Land.

Current line-up
Athelstan – guitars, bass, keyboards
Wulfstan – guitars, bass, vocals

Both Athelstan and Wulfstan also are former members of the folk metal project Folkearth.

Discography

Studio albums
Deep Into Time (1999)
The Fighting Man (2000)
Engla Tocyme (2002)
Ours Is the Kingdom (2004)
Steadfast (2008)
Last of the Line (2011)
Curse of the Cwelled (2015)
Tales From a Cloud-Born Land (2017)

Compilations
Legends Untold (2000)

Singles
Summer's Flame (2009)

References

External links
 The band's official website
 The band's entry on Encyclopaedia Metallum

English black metal musical groups
Musical groups established in 1997
Heavy metal duos
English musical duos